The list of ship launches in 1859 includes a chronological list of some ships launched in 1859.


References 

Sources

1859
1859 in transport